Lowa District was a district of the Belgian Congo. It was formed from part of Stanleyville District in 1914, and had been absorbed by Maniema District and Kivu District by 1926.

Location

The district was named after the Lowa River shown on an 1897 map as entering the Congo from the east between Lokandu to the south and Ponthierville to the north.
It was created by an arrêté royal of 28 March 1912, which divided the Congo into 22 districts.

A 1912 map shows that the large former Stanleyville District had been broken into a much smaller Stanleyville District and new Lowa, Maniema, Kivu and Ituri districts.
Lowa District was border by Stanleyville District to the north, Kivu District to the west, Maniema District to the south and Aruwimi District to the west.

The Lowa District became part of the Orientale Province created in 1914, as shown in a 1914 map.
It had disappeared by 1926, absorbed into the Kivu District and Maniema District.

Maps

See also

Districts of the Belgian Congo

Notes

References

Sources

 / http://www.kaowarsom.be/en/online_maps

Districts of the Belgian Congo
Districts of Orientale Province